Michael Belet may refer to:
 Michael Belet (senior) ( 1182), English judge of late 12th century
 Michael Belet (junior) ( 1238), English judge of early 13th century